Novy Vzglyad  (Russian: Новый Взгляд, literally New Look or New View) is a weekly newspaper published in Moscow, Russia. It used to be well known for its commentaries on politics and social issues in the 1990s.

History
It was founded in early 1992 by VID (originally created as a voice for the TV show with the same name). Kirsan Ilyumzhinov bought the newspaper and merged it with another journal. It is owned by him and former TV host (of Vzglyad show) Yevgeny Dodolev.

Once a weekly, the Novy Vzglyad is now published 45 times per year, seven issues covering two-week spans.

Publishing house
In 1995 the weekly newspaper grown into publishing house (publishing company). During 1995–1999 Novy Vzglyad Publishing House published nine magazines and periodicals (print and online) in Russia and CIS countries. It ended its four-year print run for magazines, due to economic difficulties of 1998 Russian financial crisis.

Its headquarters and printing plant are located in Moskovskaya Pravda building (Moscow). Since 2000 NVPH's portfolio includes only three newspaper including Muzykaljnaya Pravda weekly.

References

External links

1992 establishments in Russia
Newspapers published in Moscow
Publications established in 1992
Russian-language newspapers published in Russia
Weekly newspapers published in Russia